The Ángeles River is a river of Lares, Puerto Rico.

See also
List of rivers of Puerto Rico

References

External links
USGS Hydrologic Unit Map – Caribbean Region (1974)
Rios de Puerto Rico

Rivers of Puerto Rico